Hardline is a political label.

Hardline, Hard Line or hardliner may also refer to:

 Hard Line (album), a 1985 album by American band The Blasters
 Hardline (band), an American hard rock group
 Hardliner (band), a Canadian hard rock band
 Hardline coaxial cable
 Hardline (subculture), a militant offshoot of straight edge
 Hardline (video game), a video game developed by Cryo Interactive Entertainment in 1996
 Battlefield Hardline, a video game published by Electronic Arts in 2015.
Hard Line (political party), a Danish far-right political party.

See also 
 Hardlines, a business term for retail products including many non-information goods; see :Category:Hardlines (retail)
Softline (disambiguation)